Pursuit Force is an action game developed by Bigbig Studios and published by Sony Computer Entertainment for the PlayStation Portable in 2005. The game places the player in the role of a police agent who is a member of the titular elite law enforcement agency that specialises in direct armed encounters with adversaries, whether it be on foot or on the bonnet of a speeding car. The player has to try to seize cars and motorbikes while engaging in high-speed chases and gun battles against heavily armed gangs.

A sequel titled Pursuit Force: Extreme Justice was released in 2007.

Gameplay
There are a total of 30 missions, six per gang, involving fighting enemies on foot, in a speedboat and a car/motorcycle chases, or in a helicopter while manning a minigun. The player character can leap into enemy vehicles and commandeer them after shooting their occupants. The player can earn different ranks which unlock different content while completing missions will unlock new ranks which will unlock new gang missions and different abilities to help make the game easier, such as regenerating health.

The game also includes a race mode with several different courses and scenarios and a time trial mode, setting the player across all the games' tracks. These two modes are completely independent of each other and will not help nor hinder the gameplay of the other game modes. There is also a wide variety of unlockable content such as pictures and videos to access. The amount of content to unlock, however, is completely dependent on the scores in the career mode.

Plot
The Pursuit Force has been organised to destroy the threat posed by gangs responsible for many vehicle-related crime sprees across Capital State and to eliminate their leaders:

Capelli Family: One of the two gangs that are initially available at the start of the game, the Capellis are Capital State's most powerful Mafia family headed up by Don Capelli, and are said to be the state's oldest gang. The other significant member of the Capelli Family is their best sniper Stefano De Tomaso, also known as "Deadeye".
Warlords: The second of the two gangs available at the start of the game, the Warlords are a group of mercenaries and rogue soldiers who feel that they were betrayed by the military. They focus primarily on hijacking military hardware and are led by "The General", with the other significant member of the gang being Lieutenant Davies.
Convicts: The Convicts are a group of psychotic prison escapees who have broken out of prison to cause as much chaos as they can around Capital State and are about to flee the city so they can wreak havoc on a much larger scale. Their leader is a gigantic criminal known only as "Hard Balls", while the other significant member of the Convicts is an insane pyromaniac named Billy Wilde.
Vixens: The Vixens are an all-female group of professional thieves with a high-tech arsenal whose crimes are based around high-profile heists and grand thefts, from priceless artefacts to luxury speed boats. The major members of the Vixens are their leader "Whiplash" and her second-in-command and lover "The Fox".
Killer 66: The Killer 66 are a Yakuza gang based in Capital State, and the most powerful of all five gangs in the game, focusing primarily on vehicle smuggling and illegal drug trade. They are led by "Monster" Toshima; the other significant member of the gang being his second-in-command Sudeko Arakawa.

Reception

The game received "generally favourable reviews" according to the review aggregation website Metacritic.  In Japan, where the game was ported and published by Spike on 2 March 2006, Famitsu gave it a score of two eights and two sevens for a total of 30 out of 40.

Detroit Free Press gave it a score of all four stars and said that the game was "nearly perfect with its graphics that often look close to cinematic scenes and a whole host of strategies for nailing the bad guys." The Times similarly gave it all five stars and said, "Even by the high standards already set, Pursuit Force is an astonishing title... The best PSP title yet."  However, The New York Times gave it an average review and said, "Apparently the designers were afraid the game might just be too much fun, so they compensated by making the missions brutally, mind-numbingly difficult." The Sydney Morning Herald gave it a score of three out of five, saying, "Streamlined controls make performing outrageous stunts easy. But car handling is overly rigid making tight bends difficult to negotiate."

Despite its innovative gameplay, Pursuit Force was criticized for its punishing difficulty. In response, the developer reevaluated the gameplay and made sure the sequel was more playable.

References

External links

2005 video games
Helicopter video games
PlayStation Portable games
PlayStation Portable-only games
Single-player video games
Sony Interactive Entertainment games
Sony Interactive Entertainment franchises
Third-person shooters
Vehicular combat games
Video games about police officers
Video games scored by Richard Jacques
Video games developed in the United Kingdom
Video games set in the United States